G H Raisoni University is a private university located in the village Dhoda Borgaon in Chhindwara district, Madhya Pradesh, India. The university was established in 2016 by the GHR Sons Educational and Medical Research Foundation through Madhya Pradesh Niji Vishwavidyalay (Sthapana Ewam Sanchalan) Sanshodhan Adhyadesh, 2016, an Ordinance which also established Symbiosis University of Applied Sciences and the yet to be operational D.C. University. It is part of the Raisoni Group of Institutions (RGI).

Institutions 

School of Engineering & Technology
School of Sciences
School of Pharmacy
School of Agricultural Sciences
School of Commerce And Management
School of Law
School of Arts
School of Liberal Arts

References

External links

Chhindwara
Universities in Madhya Pradesh
Educational institutions established in 2016
2016 establishments in Madhya Pradesh
Private universities in India